Richard Hopkins may refer to:

Politicians
 Richard Hopkins (died 1682) (1612–1682), English politician who sat in the House of Commons in 1660
 Richard Hopkins (died 1708) (1641–1708), English politician who sat in the House of Commons variously between 1670 and 1701
 Richard Hopkins (died 1799) (1728–1799), MP for Dartmouth, Thetford, Queenborough and Harwich
 Sir Richard Hopkins (died 1736), MP for the City of London 1724–1727

Others
 Richard Hopkins (civil servant) (1880–1955), British civil servant
 Richard Joseph Hopkins (1873–1943), United States federal judge
 Richard Hopkins (TV producer) (1964–2012), British television producer
 Sir Richard Hopkins (governor), governor of the South Sea Company from 1733